Bloodline (혈맥 - Hyeolmaek) also known as Kinship is a 1963 South Korean film directed by Kim Soo-yong. It was chosen as Best Film at the Grand Bell Awards and the Blue Dragon Film Awards.

Plot
An anti-communist film based on a play by Kim Su-yeong from 1948. The film depicts conflict between the generations in a village. The elders want their children to follow the old ways, but the children pursue a newer way of life and end up supporting their parents.

Cast
Kim Seung-ho: Kim Deok-sam
Hwang Jung-seun: Bok-soong's mother
Shin Seong-il
Um Aing-ran: Bok-soong
Kim Ji-mee: Ok-hee
Choi Nam-hyun: Bok-soong's father
Shin Young-kyun: Older brother
Choi Moo-ryong: Younger brother
Jo Mi-ryeong
Joo Sun-tae

References

Bibliography

External links

1963 films
Best Picture Blue Dragon Film Award winners
Best Picture Grand Bell Award winners
Films directed by Kim Soo-yong
1960s Korean-language films
South Korean drama films
1963 drama films